Vimukthi Perera (full name Nawagamuwage Vimukthi Ramesh Perera; born 14 November 1989) is a Sri Lankan cricketer. He is a left-handed batsman and left-arm medium-fast bowler who plays for Moors Sports Club. He was born in Colombo.

Perera made his cricketing debut for Sri Lanka Schools in the 2008-09 Inter-Provincial Twenty20 Tournament.

Perera played for Moors Under-23s during the 2009 season, making his debut against Saracens Under-23s. In the first innings in which he bowled, he took figures of 5-36.

In August 2018, he was named in Galle's squad the 2018 SLC T20 League.

References

External links
Vimukthi Perera at Cricket Archive 

1989 births
Living people
Sri Lankan cricketers
Sri Lanka Schools cricketers
Moors Sports Club cricketers
Sri Lanka Schools XI cricketers